Philippe Caroit (born September 29, 1959) is a French actor, painter, and writer.

Early life 
Caroit was born in Paris, as the fourth of seven children. In his teenage years, he began to develop a passion for travelling, to discover new places and meet people, which made him also learn several foreign languages.

After finishing school, he started to study medicine, following the footsteps of his father. In the third year of studies, he joined the Conservatoire in Montpellier, where he discovered his passion for theatre. Back in Paris, he continued to study medicine and theatre in parallel. In the sixth year of medicine, while working in a hospital in the 14th arrondissement in Paris, he decided to give up the study and dedicate completely to become an actor, joining the Théâtre de Soleil of Ariane Mnouchkine.

Career 
His first cinema role was in the movie “La Femme de l’aviateur” (“The Aviator’s Wife”) directed by Eric Rohmer in 1981. The next year he had his television debut in “Les ombres” by Jean Claude Brisseau. These were followed by more than 100 roles in French and foreign movies for cinema and television across the world, as Caroit speaks also English, German, Italian and Spanish. In 1999 he directed his first short movie “Faire-part” starring Christine Murillo, Antoine Dulery and Caroline Tresca.

Beyond his roles for cinema and television, he continued to play also in theatre. Among his roles there were Jesus in “Un homme nomme Jesus” (“A Man Named Jesus” in Palais des Sports in Paris; the play entered the Guiness Book for breaking all attendance records) and Seznec in “Seznec”, both with Robert Hossein or Marc in “La Societe des Loisirs”, play written by François Archambault, which he adapted.

Caroit authored and adapted scripts for theatre (“La Societe de Loisirs” and “Tu Te Souviendras de Moi”), television (“Le Mystere des Carpates” for the tv series Cancoon) and cinema (“Faire-part”). His most recent project is “Le Chapon”.

“The Curse of the Snail” (fr: "La malediction de l’escargot"), his first novel, was published by Anne Carrière in November 2020. The pocket edition of the book will be available starting from June 2023.

Personal life 
Caroit has a daughter, Blanche, from his marriage to Caroline Tresca. Since December 2022, he is also the father of a boy named Lucien.

In his spare time, Caroit likes to paint, his works being influenced by the German Expressionism, the Fauvism and Les Nabis.

Selected filmography

Cinema

Television

External links 

 Official Website: https://www.philippecaroit.com/
 Philippe Caroit on imdb: https://www.imdb.com/name/nm0138950/
 Agency: https://www.agencea2.com/fiche.cfm/115-2_747109_philippe_caroit.html
 Showreel: https://www.youtube.com/watch?v=C8xmHXhd7Ew

References 

1959 births
20th-century French male actors
21st-century French male actors
French male film actors
French male television actors
French male stage actors
Actors from Paris
Living people